Michael Nicholas Pocalyko (born December 24, 1954) is an American businessman and writer.

Pocalyko is the managing director and chief executive officer of Monticello Capital, a boutique investment bank in Chantilly, Virginia, specializing in high technology and green enterprises. He is a Sarbanes-Oxley public company audit committee financial expert and corporate board audit committee chairman. His novel The Navigator, a literary financial thriller, was published in 2013 by Forge Books, an imprint of Macmillan Publishers.

In March 2023, Pocalyko attracted media attention for his alleged involvement in the suicide of Eden Knight.

Early life and education
Pocalyko was born in Fountain Hill, Pennsylvania in the Lehigh Valley. He grew up in Bethlehem Township, Pennsylvania in a devout Hungarian Lutheran blue collar family. His father Walter Pocalyko was business manager of the public school districts in Bethlehem, Sharon, Antietam, and Bangor and a local Democratic political figure. His mother Anna M. (Pagats) Pocalyko was an office manager for the brokerage firm of Janney Montgomery Scott. His paternal grandparents were Ukrainians who immigrated first to Canada and then to the United States; his maternal grandparents were Hungarians who arrived in the United States at Ellis Island. His paternal grandmother Dora Bendera was born in Galicia in the family of Ukrainian nationalist Stepan Bandera.

He began writing for newspapers at the age of sixteen when his first article was published in The Globe-Times. His editor was John Strohmeyer.

In 1972, he graduated from Freedom High School in Bethlehem. He attended Muhlenberg College in Allentown, Pennsylvania, where he also was a union steelworker in the ingot mould foundry at now-defunct Bethlehem Steel and a professional musician. He is a member of Sigma Phi Epsilon fraternity. In college he published poetry in literary magazines and chaired a symposium on the work of novelist John Hawkes; its proceedings became a widely cited book of literary criticism, A John Hawkes Symposium: Design and Debris, that he co-edited with Anthony C. Santore for publisher James Laughlin at New Directions.

Academic
Pocalyko graduated from Muhlenberg in 1976. He received his Master in Public Administration degree from Harvard Kennedy School in 1985. He earned his Master of Business Administration degree from the Wharton School of the University of Pennsylvania in 1995. He was a Trustee of Fairleigh Dickinson University and named by the International Association of University Presidents to the United Nations Commission on Disarmament Education, Conflict Resolution and Peace.

Pocalyko has published a number of papers on a variety of subjects, especially in the areas of defensel international affairs, and corporate governance. He is a member of the Council on Foreign Relations and was on the CFR's bipartisan independent task force co-chaired by Madeleine Albright and Vin Weber that authored the influential study In Support of Arab Democracy: Why and How. He has publicly credited economist Thomas Schelling and political scientist Richard Neustadt, both at Harvard Kennedy School, as his most influential teachers.

Career

Navy
Pocalyko was commissioned as an officer in the US Navy in 1976 and qualified as a naval aviator in 1977. He later became dual-warfare qualified at sea as a surface warfare officer. He served in the US Atlantic Fleet flying the SH-3, SH-2, and SH-60 helicopters, deploying in destroyers and frigates in the LAMPS and LAMPS Mark III platforms. During his career as a pilot, Pocalyko made more than 1,000 helicopter small deck landings.

He served in the Multinational Force in Lebanon  and was the pilot in command of the only helicopter airborne at the moment of the Beirut barracks bombing on October 23, 1983. He also commanded special intelligence missions in the Persian Gulf.

In the mid-1980s he was desk officer for the Navy’s Forward Maritime Strategy and then special assistant to Vice Admiral Henry C. Mustin II in the office of the Chief of Naval Operations. In the early 1990s he was on the personal staff of Secretary of the Navy H. Lawrence Garrett III during the Tailhook scandal. In his 1998 book Against All Enemies, investigative journalist Seymour Hersh wrote approvingly about Pocalyko's role as a veterans advocate with respect to the controversial Persian Gulf War Syndrome during his years in the Office of the Secretary of Defense from 1993 to 1995.

While a serving naval officer in Washington he was senior fellow of the Atlantic Council of the United States. A longtime observer of Russia, he traveled in the former Soviet Union with Goodpaster and Ambassador Paul Nitze and wrote then-controversial positions supporting Russian and Ukrainian defense conversion; economic development of the new nations formed from the Soviet Union; NATO expansion; and deep reductions in nuclear weapons as the Cold War ended.

He retired from the Navy in the grade of commander in 1995.

Investment banking and business
Pocalyko formed a corporate financial advisory firm in Washington D.C. that became Monticello Capital, a privately held boutique investment bank and private equity firm based in Northern Virginia and from 2003 to 2008 with offices in New York City. He co-founded Monticello Capital with Stephen Frey, an investment banker and author of financial novels who had been a vice president at JP Morgan and Westdeutsche Landesbank. Since 1997 Pocalyko has been a managing director at Monticello Capital.
 
He  has served on more than a dozen corporate boards and is a "public company audit committee financial expert" under the Sarbanes-Oxley Act. He was a director and audit committee chairman of defense contractor Herley Industries, brought in after that company’s chairman was indicted. He also chaired the board of TherimuneX Pharmaceuticals, a biotechnology company in Doylestown, Pennsylvania.

Politics
In 1984, Pocalyko became one of The Heritage Foundation's "Third Generation," the "young leaders of [an] army of conservative activists." It was his "Third Generation Military Leadership" that first gained him national notice on the political stage. Pocalyko served terms on the Fairfax County Industrial Development Authority and on Virginia's Commonwealth Competition Council, appointed by Governor Jim Gilmore as the governor's representative and remaining during part of the administration of Governor Mark Warner.

He was a district chairman for six years in the Republican Party of Virginia.

1999 Virginia House campaign
In 1999, he was the endorsed Republican candidate for the Virginia House of Delegates from the 36th District, in Reston and western Fairfax County, and ran against incumbent Democrat Ken Plum, then chairman of the Democratic Party of Virginia. Pocalyko campaigned as a "progressive Republican" in the left-leaning district with strong backing from Senator John Warner, a Capitol Hill mentor, and from Governor Jim Gilmore. He took conservative positions on limited government, fiscal matters and taxation (although he refused to sign the Americans for Tax Reform "Taxpayer Protection Pledge"), law and order, Second Amendment rights, faith-based initiatives, and backing the death penalty, but was moderate on issues like the environment, immigration, and public education. He was among the very few Virginia GOP candidates who met with gay community leaders; he pledged active support for expanded gay and lesbian rights and appeared at Log Cabin Republican events. Pocalyko was criticized by The Washington Post for a leaflet distributed by his campaign accusing his opponent of "voting to protect child molesters who murder children."

Pocalyko lost to Plum by 61.83 percent to 35.42 percent of the vote.

Writing
Since the 1970s, Pocalyko has published newspaper features, academic papers, essays, reviews, and opinion pieces, notably for McClatchy, in The Morning Call, The Florida Times-Union, The Virginian-Pilot and Ledger Star, Proceedings of the United States Naval Institute and NACD Directorship.

The Navigator

His novel The Navigator was published by Forge Books, an imprint of Macmillan Publishers.

Special Investigations Limited Company 

Pocalyko is currently the CEO of Special Investigations Limited Company, described as "a professional services firm and government contractor in the investigations, intelligence, and cyber sectors."

In March 2023, Special Investigations faced criticism for Pocalyko's role in allegedly luring a transgender woman back to her family in Saudi Arabia, where she was forced to detransition and later died by suicide.

Personal life
Pocalyko married his classmate Barbara Snelbaker after their college graduation in 1976. They have two children. He lives in Reston in Northern Virginia and on the Blue Ridge in the Shenandoah Valley.

References

External links
 Michael Pocalyko's web page at Monticello Capital
 Official website for The Navigator at Macmillan Publishers
 Biography at the National Association of Corporate Directors
 Blog posts at Algonquin Redux

Living people
1954 births
American corporate directors
American Lutherans
American male novelists
21st-century American novelists
American people of Ukrainian descent
American people of Hungarian descent
Freedom High School (Pennsylvania) alumni
Muhlenberg College alumni
Harvard Kennedy School alumni
Wharton School of the University of Pennsylvania alumni
Bethlehem Steel people
United States Naval Aviators
Virginia Republicans
Writers from Bethlehem, Pennsylvania
People from Reston, Virginia
People from the Shenandoah Valley
21st-century American male writers
Novelists from Pennsylvania
Military personnel from Pennsylvania